Elongator complex protein 3, also named KAT9, is a protein that in humans is encoded by the ELP3 gene. ELP3 is the catalytic histone acetyltransferase subunit of the RNA polymerase II elongator complex, which is a component of the RNA polymerase II (Pol II) holoenzyme and is involved in transcriptional elongation. ELP3 supports the migration and branching of projection neurons through acetylation of alpha-tubulin in the developing cerebral cortex. In mammals, ELP3 is important for paternal DNA demethylation after fertilization. ELP3 is potentially involved in cellular redox homeostasis by mediating the acetylation of glucose-6-phosphate dehydrogenase. Besides, ELP3 may play a role in chromatin remodeling and is involved in acetylation of histones H3 and probably H4.

References

Further reading